"At a Calvary near the Ancre" is a poem by Wilfred Owen on the Ancre, a tributary of the Somme. It was the scene of two notable battles in 1916. The poem is composed of three quatrains rhyming abab.

The poem links the Crucifixion of Christ to the battlefield of the First World War.  Not only are there allusions to the crucifixion narratives but the Mark of the Beast  (Revelation 13: 16).  Another allusion which links to the Crucifixion is the crossroads of the first line as a crossroads was a traditional place to hang criminals or display their corpses on gibbets.  The political (scribes) and religious (priests) authorities that are encouraging the prosecution of the war are compared to the authorities that caused the Crucifixion.  The reference to the Soldiers has a double-meaning here - they echo the Soldiers that mocked Christ (Matthew 27: 27-30, Mark 15: 16-19) but also the soldiers who fight in the war, so they are contrasted with the disciples that deserted Christ so become the ones who stand with Christ in his suffering - even standing as Christ in his passion - having been abandoned by the authorities to fight and die.

The second verse attacks the religious authorities by comparing them to the priests who condemned Christ and took him to Pilate.  From a theological viewpoint (such as found in C. S. Lewis' Mere Christianity), which declares Pride to be the worst sin because it sets the individual directly against God, the Mark of the Beast could be described as a visual manifestation of Pride itself.  This is a possible interpretation of the verse.

The final verse is notable for the oblique echo of Owen's famous manifesto of his war poetry, when he talks about the 'pity of war' but also the famous statement of Christ: "This is my commandment, That ye love one another, as I have loved you.  Greater love hath no man than this, that a man lay down his life for his friends." (John 15: 12-13).  He is contrasting the patriotic sentiments that the political leaders have been pushing when they "bawl allegiance to the state" and their sentiments of hating the enemy with the universal love of Christ.

References

Poetry by Wilfred Owen
World War I poems